The 2003 Priority Telecom Open was a men's tennis tournament played on outdoor clay courts in Amersfoort, Netherlands that was part of the International Series of the 2003 ATP Tour. It was the 44th edition of the tournament and was held from 14 July until 20 July 2003. Seventh-seeded Nicolás Massú won the singles title.

Finals

Singles
 
 Nicolás Massú defeated  Raemon Sluiter 6–4, 7–6(7–3), 6–2
 It was Massú's 1st title of the year and the 2nd of his career.

Doubles

 Devin Bowen /  Ashley Fisher defeated  Chris Haggard /  André Sá 6–0, 6–4
 It was Bowen's only title of the year and the 1st of his career. It was Fisher's only title of the year and the 1st of his career.

References

External links
ITF – Amersfoort tournament details
Singles draw
Doubles draw
Qualifying Singles draw

Priority Telecom Open
Dutch Open (tennis)
2003 in Dutch tennis
Priority Telecom Open, 2003